Gaël Monfils defeated Andrey Rublev in the final, 6–2, 6–3 to win the singles tennis title at the 2018 Qatar Open.

Novak Djokovic was the two-time reigning champion, but withdrew before the tournament due to an elbow injury.

Seeds

Draw

Finals

Top half

Bottom half

Qualifying

Seeds

Qualifiers

Qualifying draw

First qualifier

Second qualifier

Third qualifier

Fourth qualifier

References
 Main Draw
 Qualifying Draw

Singles